Hypospila thermesina is a species of moth of the  family Erebidae. It is found in the Indian Ocean on the Seychelles and La Réunion.

This species has a wingspan of 37mm.

References

Moths described in 1862
Hypospila